Ragged Point Lighthouse is situated at the easternmost point of the island of Barbados, near the village of Ragged Point in the parish of Saint Philip.

See also
 List of lighthouses in Barbados

References

External links

  De sommet en sommet, les Alpes en péril (broadcast to French/German TV Arte) : Ragged point as the best spot for climatologists to monitor cloud formations in the Caribbean Sea, like Hawaii for the Pacific High ; hence the German Max Planck Institute for Meteorology settled a Climate research center there.

Lighthouses in Barbados
Saint Philip, Barbados
Lighthouses completed in 1875